Galesh Kola may refer to:
 Galesh Kola, Amol
 Galesh Kola-ye Bala, Babolsar
 Galesh Kola-ye Pain, Babolsar
 Galesh Kola, Sari
 Galesh Kola, Savadkuh